The Type 12 Surface-to-Ship Missile (12式地対艦誘導弾) is a truck-mounted anti-ship missile developed by Japan's Mitsubishi Heavy Industries in 2012. It is an upgrade of the Type 88 Surface-to-Ship Missile. The Type 12 features INS with mid-course GPS guidance and better precision due to enhanced Terrain Contour Matching and target discrimination capabilities.

The missile shares the same Ka-band Active Electronic Scanned Array (AESA) radar seeker with Japanese BVRAAM missile, AAM-4B.

The range has doubled to 400 kilometers and is also planning to re-apply for the improved version of the surface-to-ship system and the air-launched variant for the P-1 patrol aircraft.

The MoD approved the development of an improved version of the Type 12 SSM on December 18, 2020 by the Cabinet. According to Japanese newspapers, the range will be extended from 200 km to 900 km, with a future target of 1,500 km. It will have a stealthy shape to reduce RCS, as well as high mobility to prevent interception from the enemy. It can attack not only naval vessels but also ground targets. The MoD intends to launch the improved Type 12 SSM not only from the ground, but also from naval vessels and aircraft. Development of the improved Type 12 ground-launched anti-ship missile is expected to finish by fiscal year 2025.

See also
 Anti-ship missile
 Type 03 Chū-SAM
 Type 80 Air-to-Ship Missile
 Type 88 Surface-to-Ship Missile
 Type 90 Ship-to-Ship Missile
 Type 93 Air-to-Ship Missile
 ASM-3

References

Anti-ship missiles of Japan
Anti-ship cruise missiles
Type 12
Military equipment introduced in the 2010s